Pyridone may refer to several organic compounds with the formula :

2-Pyridone
3-Pyridone
4-Pyridone